Patrixbourne Priory was a priory in Kent, England.

References

Monasteries in Kent